San Juan Colorado  is a town and municipality in Oaxaca in south-western Mexico. The municipality covers an area of 85.48 km². 
It is located in the Jamiltepec District in the west of the Costa Region.

As of 2005, the municipality had a total population of 8669.

References

Municipalities of Oaxaca